The Riffa Views Skins Game is a skins game, that is contested by some of the world's top golfers. It is currently sponsored by the host, Riffa Views Estates in Bahrain.  

The inaugural event in 2008 was played over The Montgomerie course at Riffa Views Signature Estates. The Montgomerie was designed by Colin Montgomerie, who also competed in the event alongside Camilo Villegas, Michael Campbell, and Retief Goosen. Goosen was the overall skins and money winner after winning the final $50,000 skin in a shootout on the 18th hole.

Results

2008
Played over The Montgomerie course at Riffa Views Signature Estates, Bahrain.

References

Unofficial money golf tournaments
Sport in Bahrain